João Batista da Cruz Santos Neto (born 10 July 2003), commonly known as João Neto, is a Brazilian professional footballer who plays as an forward for Fluminense.

Career statistics

Club

References

2003 births
Living people
Sportspeople from Bahia
Brazilian footballers
Association football forwards
Campeonato Brasileiro Série A players
Fluminense FC players